São Pedro do Sul may refer to:
 São Pedro do Sul, Portugal
 São Pedro do Sul, Rio Grande do Sul, Brazil